Principe Amedeo was an ironclad warship built by the Italian Regia Marina in the 1860s and 1870s. Principe Amedeo was laid down in 1865, launched in 1872, and completed in late 1874. She was armed with a battery of six  guns and one  gun.

Principe Amedeos lengthy construction time rendered her obsolescent by the time she entered service. As a result, she primarily served as a station ship in Italy's overseas empire. In November 1881, she collided with the ironclad  in a storm in Naples. Principe Amadeo was withdrawn from service in 1888 and converted into a headquarters ship for the vessels defending Taranto. She was stricken from the naval register in 1895 and thereafter used as a depot ship until she was broken up for scrap in 1910.

Design

Her superstructure consisted of a small conning tower. She had a crew of 548 officers and men.

Her propulsion system consisted of one single-expansion steam engine that drove a single screw propeller, with steam supplied by six coal-fired, cylindrical fire-tube boilers that were vented through a single funnel placed directly aft of the conning tower. The ship was barque-rigged to supplement the steam engine; Principe Amedeo and her sister were the last rigged ironclads to be built by Italy.

Principe Amedeo was armed with a main battery of six  guns, mounted in a single armored casemates placed amidships, with three guns on each broadside. A  gun was mounted forward as a bow chaser.

Service history

Principe Amedeo was laid down at the Arsenale di La Spezia in August 1865, and her completed hull was launched on 15 January 1872. Fitting-out work proceeded very slowly, and the ship was finally completed on 15 December 1874. Obsolescent by the time she was completed, Principe Amedeo primarily served in the Italian colonial empire, which Italy had begun acquiring in the 1880s. She occasionally took part in training maneuvers with the main Italian fleet throughout her career.

On 25 June 1879, Principe Amedeo collided with the Italian steamship Mediteranee off Riposto. Both vessels were damaged. Principe Amedeo was taken in to Naples for repairs. At the time, Principe Amedeo flew the flag of Vice Admiral Martini. In early November 1881, Principe Amedeo was moored in Naples when a severe storm tore the ironclad  free from her anchors and knocked her into Principe Amedeo. Neither ship was damaged in the collision.

For the annual fleet maneuvers held in 1885, Principe Amedeo served as the flagship of the "Eastern Squadron", with Rear Admiral Civita commanding. She was joined by the ironclad , the corvette , a sloop, and four torpedo boats. The "Eastern Squadron" defended against an attacking "Western Squadron", simulating a Franco-Italian conflict, with operations conducted off Sardinia. During the exercises, Principe Amedeo was forced to "surrender" by the ironclad .

From 1888 to 1889, Principe Amedeo was employed as the headquarters ship for the forces defending Taranto. By this time, she had been equipped with six  guns for close-range defense, six machine guns, and two torpedo tubes. The ship was stricken from the naval register on 28 March 1895 and thereafter used as an ammunition depot ship in Taranto. She was eventually broken up for scrap in 1910.

Notes

References

External links
 Principe Amedeo Marina Militare website 

Principe Amedeo
Ships built in Castellammare di Stabia
1872 ships
Maritime incidents in June 1879